The women's artistic team competition at the 2014 Asian Games in Incheon, South Korea was held on 22 September 2014 at the Namdong Gymnasium.

Schedule
All times are Korea Standard Time (UTC+09:00)

Results

References

Results

External links
Official website

Artistic Women Team